The Battle of Lwów was a World War II battle for the control over the Soviet city of Lwów (now Lviv, Ukraine) between the Red Army and the invading Wehrmacht and the hiking groups OUN.

History
Protection of the city’s infrastructure was carried out by the 223rd regiment from the 13th division of the NKVD escort troops. On 24 June the 1st company of the regiment prevented the mass escape from Lvov Prison No. 1. Also, the soldiers of the regiment defended the city from the actions of looters, OUN members and Nazi saboteurs. From 29 to 30 June 1941 the regiment’s battalion covered the withdrawal of units of the 6th army from Lviv and then departed along the route -Bóbrka-Rohatyn-Kozova-Tarnopol under the direct influence of the Luftwaffe.

Immediately after the departure of the Red Army, NKVD troops and border guards, the massacre of Lviv professors and Lviv pogrom was organized, and then the ghetto and concentration camps began to form under the leadership of the German administration by the Ukrainian auxiliary police, formed from the OUN marching groups.

The city was liberated from the Nazis three years later, in the summer of 1944, during the Lvov–Sandomierz Offensive.

See also
 Lwów Ghetto

References

External links 
 Germans capture Lvov—and slaughter ensues
 The initial period of the Great Patriotic War of 1941-1945 

Battles and operations of the Soviet–German War
History of Lviv
June 1941 events